Medinilla multiflora is a species of semi-epiphytic plant endemic to the Philippines. It flowers year-round, peaking at around May and June.

It is also known erroneously as the "Malaysian orchid" in the ornamental plant trade (usually under its synonym Medinilla myriantha), but it is not an orchid and it is not native to Malaysia.

References

Flora of the Philippines
myriantha
Plants described in 1906
Taxa named by Elmer Drew Merrill
Endemic flora of the Philippines